Nah und Fern (English: Near and Far) is a boxed set collecting the four albums released by Wolfgang Voigt under the Gas alias between 1996 and 2000, released on 10 June 2008. An edited double vinyl edition was also released alongside the compact disc box set. Voigt noted around the time of release that, during remastering of his work, the music seemed to resist attempts at cleaning up the recordings, with the muffled or lo-fi nature of some elements of the music forming an integral part of the characteristic Gas sound. All four albums were originally released on the label Mille Plateaux. The box set reached #13 on the Billboard Top World Music Albums chart.

Nah und Fern contains some differences between its contents and the previously issued versions of each album. Apart from overall remastering of the music, several songs appear in slightly longer versions. Notably, tracks 1 and 3 on Gas are replaced by entirely new compositions, while track 4 is highly remixed. Track 6 of Zauberberg also appears in a much longer extended version.

A double vinyl LP version of Nah und Fern was also released, featuring one song each from Zauberberg, Königsforst and Pop, along with a new song, "Nah und Fern".

Track listing

Compact disc box set

Vinyl pressing

References

External links 
 

Ambient compilation albums
Electronic compilation albums
Gas (musician) albums
2008 compilation albums
Kompakt compilation albums